Wood betony is the common name for several plants and may refer to:

Pedicularis canadensis in the family Orobanchaceae
Betonica officinalis formerly known as Stachys officinalis in the family Lamiaceae